Adunni Bankole (March 1959 – 3 January 2015) was a Nigerian society matriarch and businesswoman. She was the Yeye Mokun of Owu kingdom, a city in Abeokuta, the capital of Ogun State, southwestern Nigeria.

Personal life
She was born in March 1959 at Owu kingdom of Abeokuta in Ogun State, southwestern Nigeria.
She was married to the second republic politician, chief Alani Bankole who was the father of the former speaker of the house of representatives, honorable Dimeji Bankole.

Death
She died of heart attack on 3 January 2015 following  heart surgery. It was reported that she died a few hours before her daughter's wedding ceremony.

See also
Dimeji Bankole

References

1959 births
People from Ogun State
Businesspeople from Abeokuta
2015 deaths
Nigerian women in business
Yoruba women in business
People from Abeokuta
Yoruba people